Vienna Insurance Group AG Wiener Versicherung Gruppe (VIG) with its registered office in Vienna, Austria, is one of the largest international insurance groups in Central and Eastern Europe with approximately 25,000 employees.

History
History of Vienna Insurance Group dates back to 1824, with the founding of the k.u.k. priv. wechselseitige Brandschaden Versicherung.

In the end of the 1980s, the company started expanding in central and eastern Europe, founding Kooperativa in Czechoslovakia.

In 1994, the company was transformed into a corporation, and 11% of the stock was introduced on the Vienna Stock Exchange, in the form of preferred shares. Those were changed into common shares in 2005, as the company increased its capital by about €900 million to finance acquisitions.

In 2006, the brand Vienna Insurance Group was introduced as a global brand. In central and eastern Europe, subsidiaries use it next to their original name.

In 2008, a new capital increase permitted the acquisition of the insurance business of Erste Group, which turned VIG to the market leader in central and eastern Europe. Simultaneously, a long-term sales agreement was signed with Erste Group. In the same year VIG founded ViG Re, a reinsurance company located in Prague, Czech Republic.

During the 2010 shareholder meeting, it was decided to create a 100% subsidiary for the insurance business in Austria, Wiener Städtische Versicherung AG Vienna Insurance Group.

In March 2014, it was revealed that PZU and Vienna Insurance Group were in the race to acquire rival Lietuvos Draudimas for around $147 million.

Management
Since January 1, 2016, Elisabeth Stadler is the Chairwoman of the Managing Board of Vienna Insurance Group. She also serves as General Manager and CEO.

 Chairwoman of the Managing Board Elisabeth Stadler (CEO)
 Member of the Managing Board Liane Hirner (CFO)
 Member of the Managing Board Franz Fuchs
 Member of the Managing Board Peter Thirring
 Member of the Managing Board Judit Havasi
 Member of the Managing Board Peter Höfinger

The supervisory board consists of ten members, with Elisabeth Stadler being chairwoman.

Structure
With its internationalisation strategy in the CEE economic region, Vienna Insurance Group made the transition from a national insurance company to an international insurance group with more than 50 insurance companies in 25 countries. In total, about 50% of all group premiums already come from the Central and Eastern European markets.

Vienna Insurance Group is active in Austria, Albania, Bulgaria, Germany, Estonia, Georgia, Croatia, Latvia, Liechtenstein, Lithuania, Macedonia, Montenegro, Poland, Romania, Serbia, Slovakia, Czech Republic, Turkey, Hungary, Ukraine, Belarus and Bosnia and Herzegovina through interests it holds in insurance companies. The Group also has branch offices in Italy and Slovenia.

Listing
Since 1992 the company is listed on the Vienna Stock Exchange, and since 2005 it has been a member of the Austrian Traded Index. The major shareholder is Wiener Städtische Wechselseitiger Versicherungsverein – Vermögensverwaltung – Vienna Insurance Group, with a stake of about 70%.

See also

References

External links

 
 Vienna Stock Exchange: Market Data Vienna Insurance Group AG

Austrian brands
Companies based in Vienna
Financial services companies established in 1824
Insurance companies of Austria